Benthomangelia is a genus of sea snails, marine gastropod mollusks in the family Mangeliidae.

Species
Species within the genus Benthomangelia include:
 Benthomangelia abyssopacifica Sysoev, 1988
 Benthomangelia antonia (Dall, 1881)
 Benthomangelia bandella (Dall, 1881)
 Benthomangelia brachytona (Watson, 1881)
 Benthomangelia brevis Sysoev & Ivanov, 1985
 Benthomangelia celebensis (Schepman, 1913)
 Benthomangelia decapitata Bouchet & Warén, 1980
 Benthomangelia enceladus Figueira & Absalão, 2010
 Benthomangelia gracilispira (Powell, 1969)
 † Benthomangelia grippi  (Anderson, 1964)  
 Benthomangelia macra (Watson, 1881)
 † Benthomangelia praegrateloupi Lozouet, 2017 
 Benthomangelia trophonoidea (Schepman, 1913)
 † Benthomangelia venusta (Peyrot, 1931) 
Species brought into synonymy
 Benthomangelia diomedeae A.E. Verrill & S. Smith, 1884: synonym of Benthomangelia antonia (Dall, 1881)
 Benthomangelia incincta R.B. Watson, 1881 : synonym of Benthomangelia antonia (Dall, 1881)
 Benthomangelia innocens K.H.J. Thiele, 1925: synonym of Benthomangelia antonia (Dall, 1881)
 Benthomangelia subtrophonoidea Okutani, 1964: synonym of Propebela subtrophonoidea (Okutani, 1964)

References

 Thiele, J. 1925. Gastropoda der Deutschen Tiefsee-Expedition, 11. Wiss. Ergebn. dt. Tiefsee Exped. 'Valdivia' 17(2): 37-382
 Sysoev, A. V., and D. L. Ivanov. "Nex Taxa of the Family Turridae (Gastropoda, Toxoglossa) from the Naska-ridge (Southeast Pacific)." Zoologichesky Zhurnal 64.2 (1985): 194-205.
 Gofas, S.; Le Renard, J.; Bouchet, P. (2001). Mollusca, in: Costello, M.J. et al. (Ed.) (2001). European register of marine species: a check-list of the marine species in Europe and a bibliography of guides to their identification. Collection Patrimoines Naturels, 50: pp. 180–213
 Bouchet P., Kantor Yu.I., Sysoev A. & Puillandre N. (2011) A new operational classification of the Conoidea. Journal of Molluscan Studies 77: 273-308

External links
 Worldwide Mollusc Species Data Base: Mangeliidae
 Puillandre, Nicolas, et al. "An integrative approach to species delimitation in Benthomangelia (Mollusca: Conoidea)." Biological Journal of the Linnean Society 96.3 (2009): 696-708.

 
Gastropod genera